Antonio Riva Palacio López (1926 – July 14, 2014) was a Mexican lawyer, politician, and member of the Institutional Revolutionary Party (PRI). He served as the Governor of Morelos for a full six-year term from 1988 until 1994. He was also appointed as Mexico's Ambassador to Ecuador from 1994 to 1998.

He was speaker of the senate during the LIII Legislature of the Mexican Congress.

After leaving the governor's office, Riva Palacio was accused of leaving the state deep in debt while personally becoming wealthy. He was alleged to have committed hundreds of cases of abuse of power, nepotism, and other crimes, including homicide. On August 5, 1993, he and his attorney general, Tomás Flores Allende, were nearly lynched in Jonacatepec after the police attacked several of the townspeople. The citizens were repressed by Grupo Scorpion under the command of Colonel Jorge Encinas Gutiérrz. None of the accusations went to trial.

See also
List of people from Morelos, Mexico

References

2014 deaths
Governors of Morelos
Ambassadors of Mexico to Ecuador
Presidents of the Senate of the Republic (Mexico)
Presidents of the Chamber of Deputies (Mexico)
20th-century Mexican lawyers
Institutional Revolutionary Party politicians
People from Morelos
Politicians from Morelos
People from Cuernavaca
1926 births
20th-century Mexican politicians